The C&C 115 is an American sailboat, that was designed by Tim Jackett and first built in 2005. Its designation indicates its metric length overall in decimeters.

Production
The boat was built by C&C Yachts in the United States, starting in 2005. It is now out of production.

Design

The C&C 115 is a small recreational keelboat, built predominantly of fiberglass. It has a fractional sloop rig, an internally-mounted spade-type rudder and a fixed fin keel. It displaces  and carries  of lead ballast.

The boat has a PHRF racing average handicap of 66 with a high of 85 and low of 57.

See also
List of sailing boat types

References

External links

Keelboats
2000s sailboat type designs
Sailing yachts
Sailboat type designs by Tim Jackett
Sailboat types built by C&C Yachts